Kimbell is a surname. Notable people with the surname include:

People
Anne Kimbell (1932–2017), American actress
Douglas Kimbell (born 1960), former USA National Team water polo player and Olympic medallist
Gail Kimbell, the 16th and first female Chief of the U.S. Forest Service
George C. Kimbell or George C. Kimble (1803–1836), defender and officer of the Alamo Mission in San Antonio
Kay Kimbell (1886–1964), entrepreneur and philanthropist, benefactor of the Kimbell Art Museum
Ralph Kimbell (1884–1964), English cricketer

Other
Kimbell, New Zealand, a small locality in Canterbury, New Zealand
Kimbell Art Museum in Fort Worth, Texas, United States
The Kimbell-James Massacre at Fort Sinquefield, Alabama, United States

See also
Kimball (disambiguation)
Kimble (disambiguation)